K2 is a sports and leisure facility covering 57,194 m2  in Pease Pottage Hill Crawley, UK.

Development
The building belongs to Crawley Borough Council and was completed in 2005 for £25.76m. It replaced Crawley leisure centre (built in 1964) the same year, which was sold for £32m in order to fund K2 (Crawley also received £5m through land swaps with the county council). John Thraves; Crawley Council member is quoted as saying "I am very pleased to tell rate-payers of Crawley that it has not cost them a penny" in an interview with the BBC. In January 2018 it received upgrades to its gym equipment worth £300,000.

Management
In November 2018 it was taken over by SLM operating as Everyone Active, along with the gym, sports hall and café in the Bewbush Centre and the 3G pitch and pavilion in Broadfield.

List of facilities 
 Olympic size swimming pool
 Kid's Pool
 Gym
 Climbing wall
 Creche
 Sauna & Steam Room
 Indoor golf
 Sports shop
 Cafe
 Squash courts
 8-Lane Running Track
 Athletic Equipment
 Hairdressers
 Racket Sports Facility
 Osteopath Clinic
 Bowls court
 Trampolines

2018 Snooker Open 
K2 hosted the English Open snooker tournament in October 2018. On the first day of the open, current title holder, Ronnie O'Sullivan described the venue as "a bit of a hellhole", stating "all I can smell is urine." World Snooker responded to these comments praising the centre in a statement that said that "K2 Crawley is an excellent venue with very good facilities." World Champion Mark Williams concurred and is quoted as saying "We play in leisure centres all over the place and this is one of the better ones." Mark Davis reached his first career ranking final after beating O'Sullivan in the semi final. Stuart Bingham went on to win the final, breaking down in tears following his victory, his first triumph since his return from a 6-month ban for betting on matches.

See also 
 West Sussex
 Thomas Bennett Community College
 Health Club
 New Towns Act 1946

References

Buildings and structures in Crawley
2005 establishments in England
Sports venues in West Sussex
Netball venues in England